Epiquerez is a former municipality in the district of Franches-Montagnes in the canton of Jura in Switzerland. Since January 1, 2009 it is a part of the new municipality of Clos du Doubs in the Porrentruy District.

References

External links

Former municipalities of the canton of Jura
Clos du Doubs